The Caucasus Military District (Kavkazskiy voenniy okrug) was a military formation of the Imperial Russian Army. It was created in 1865 as the successor to the Caucasus Army, and was dissolved in 1917.

History
The Caucus Military District was created as part of the military reforms of the minister Dmitry Milyutin.

During the entire existence of the District, the District Commander in Chief was also supreme civil authority in the Caucasus and Ataman of Caucasian troops. In 1865 - 1881 and again in 1905 - 1917, the District Commander in Chief was also His Majesty's Viceroy in the Caucasus.

On the formation of the District, the Grand Duke Mikhail Nikolayevich (who had already been His Majesty's Viceroy in the Caucasus and Commander in Chief of the Caucasus Army since December 6, 1862) became its first Commander in Chief. On August 23, 1915 (during the First World War), the Grand Duke Nikolai Nikolaevich was appointed to this post, a post he held until February 3, 1917.

The Caucasus Army was formed in July 1914 from units of the Caucasus Military District. This army ceased to exist in April 1917 when it was reorganized by the new Russian Republic as the Caucasus Front, although this Front contained many of the same units and continued fighting in the same theater. This Front in turn dissolved and formally ceased to exist in March 1918.

Area
After a series of changes in 1866, 1868, 1878, 1881, 1883, 1898 and 1899, by 1914 the area of the District included seven provinces (Stavropol, Tiflis, Kutaisi, Elisavetpol, Baku, Erevan and the Black Sea) and five regions (Kuban, Terek, Dagestan, Kars and Batumi) - a total of 12 administrative divisions, of which three were in the north and nine in the Caucasus, these nine forming the Caucasian Viceroyality of which the Commander in Chief of the district was viceroy.

Composition of forces
I Caucasus Army Corps
II Caucasus Army Corps
III Caucasus Army Corps
Fortress of Alexandropol
Fortress of Kars
Fortress of St. Michael's (Batumi)

Commanders of the Caucasus Military District
 Adjutant General, General of Artillery, and (from April 16, 1878) Field Marshal Grand Duke Mikhail Nikolayevich: 1865 - July 14, 1881
Adjutant General and General of Cavalry Prince Alexander Mikhailovich Dondukov-Korsakov: January 1, 1882 - June 3, 1890
Adjutant General and Lieutenant General Sergey Sheremetev: June 3, 1890 - December 12, 1896
Adjutant General and General of Infantry Prince Grigory Golitsyn: December 12, 1896 - January 1, 1905
Lieutenant General James D. Malama: January 1, 1905 - February 21, 1905
Adjutant General and General of Cavalry Count Illarion Vorontsov-Dashkov: February 27, 1905 - August 30, 1914
Adjutant General and General of Cavalry Grand Duke Nikolai Nikolaevich: August 30, 1914 - February 3, 1917
General of Infantry Alexander Alexander Myshlayevsky: March 7, 1917 - June 2, 1917

External links
History of the Russian Imperial Army and its military forces 

Military districts of the Russian Empire
Modern history of Georgia (country)
History of the Caucasus under the Russian Empire
Modern history of Azerbaijan
Modern history of Armenia
1865 establishments in the Russian Empire